Rodrigo de Souza Prado (born 11 September 1995), simply known as Rodrigão, is a Brazilian footballer who plays for Russian club Zenit Saint Petersburg, as a centre-back.

Club career
On 1 July 2021, he signed with Russian Premier League club PFC Sochi.

On 7 July 2022, Rodrigão signed with Russian champions Zenit Saint Petersburg on a three-year contract with an option to extend.

Career statistics

References

External links

1995 births
Living people
Brazilian footballers
Association football defenders
Campeonato Brasileiro Série A players
Campeonato Brasileiro Série B players
Campeonato Brasileiro Série D players
Primeira Liga players
Russian Premier League players
Clube Atlético Mineiro players
Associação Atlética Caldense players
Coimbra Esporte Clube players
Boa Esporte Clube players
Associação Ferroviária de Esportes players
Gil Vicente F.C. players
PFC Sochi players
FC Zenit Saint Petersburg players
Brazilian expatriate footballers
Expatriate footballers in Portugal
Expatriate footballers in Russia
Brazilian expatriate sportspeople in Portugal
Brazilian expatriate sportspeople in Russia
Footballers from Brasília